Ethem (pronounced // or //) is a Turkish male given name and may refer to:

 Ethem Nejat, Turkish revolutionary communist militant
 Ethem Pasha, Ottoman commander
 Çerkes Ethem, Turkish militia leader

See also
 Ethem, in the Lineage of Ether in the Book of Mormon
 Adham, a variant of the name

Turkish masculine given names